John Draper may refer to:

 John Draper (1943–), American computer hacker and phone phreaker who used the pseudonym "Captain Crunch"
 John Christopher Draper (1835–1885), American chemist, a son of John William Draper and brother of Henry Draper
 John William Draper (1811–1882), American (English-born) scientist, philosopher, physician, chemist, historian and photographer
 John Draper (MP for New Shoreham), 1413–1416, MP for New Shoreham (UK Parliament constituency)
 John Draper (MP for Rochester), in 1420, MP for Rochester (UK Parliament constituency)
 John Draper (motorcyclist) (1939–2002), English professional motorcycle racer